Brain Dead, brain dead or brain-dead may refer to:

Medicine
 Brain death, the irreversible cessation of all brain activity

Cinema and television
 Brain Dead (1990 film), an American horror thriller
 Braindead (film), a 1992 New Zealand comedy horror film
 Brain Dead (2007 film), a horror film
 BrainDead, an American television series (2016)

Music
 Brain Dead (band)
 "Braindead", a song by The Vines on the album Melodia
 "Braindead", a song by Dune Rats on the album The Kids Will Know It's Bullshit
 "Brain Dead", a song by Judas Priest on the album Jugulator
 "Brain Dead", a song by Sharon Needles on the album Battle Axe
 "Brain Dead", a song by Exodus on the album Pleasures of the Flesh
 "Brain Dead", a song by Flotsam and Jetsam on the album Unnatural Selection

See also
 Brain Dead 13, a video game